Peter Anderson (1901–1984) was an American ceramist and founder of Shearwater Pottery in Ocean Springs, Mississippi. He was born in New Orleans to George Walter Anderson, a grain broker, and Annette McConnell Anderson, member of a prominent New Orleans family, who had studied art at Newcomb College, where he had absorbed the ideals of the American Arts and Crafts movement.

Career
in 1928 Anderson opened his business: Shearwater Pottery. The business turned, jiggered and cast pottery pieces which were then glazed. By 1931 the Shearwater pottery achieved national recognition in Ney York's Contemporary American Ceramics Exhibition. His pieces were also displayed at several museums including The Virginia Museum of fine Arts and the Old Capitol Museum in Jackson.

Legacy
The Walter Anderson Museum of Art (WAMA) in Ocean Springs, Mississippi has been hosting an annual Peter Anderson Arts and Crafts Festival for 43 years. In 2021 the two-day event hosted 150,000 visitors.

References

1901 births
1984 deaths
American potters
People from Ocean Springs, Mississippi
Manlius Pebble Hill School alumni
Public Works of Art Project artists
20th-century ceramists